Joseph Lyman Silsbee (November 25, 1848 – January 31, 1913) was a significant American architect during the 19th and 20th centuries. He was well known for his facility of drawing and gift for designing buildings in a variety of styles. His most prominent works ran through Syracuse, Buffalo and Chicago. He was influential as mentor to a generation of architects, most notably architects of the Prairie School including the famous architect Frank Lloyd Wright.

Early life
Joseph Lyman Silsbee was born on November 25, 1848, in Salem, Massachusetts. Silsbee graduated from Phillips Exeter Academy in 1865 and Harvard in 1869. In 1870, he became an early student of the first school of architecture in the United States at the Massachusetts Institute of Technology (MIT).

Career
After graduating from Harvard and MIT, he served an apprenticeship with Boston architects William Robert Ware & Henry Van Brunt and William Ralph Emerson, respectively.  Silsbee traveled around Europe before moving to Syracuse, New York in 1874.  In 1875, he married Anna Baldwin Sedgwick, daughter of influential lawyer and politician Charles Baldwin Sedgwick.  He had a prolific practice and at one point had three simultaneously operating offices.  He had offices in Syracuse (1875–1885), Buffalo (Silsbee & Marling, 1882–1887), and Chicago (Silsbee and Kent, 1883–1884).  From 1883 to 1885, his Syracuse office was a partnership with architect Ellis G. Hall. Silsbee's Chicago office had a number of architects who were later to become known in their own right, including:
Frank Lloyd Wright
George Grant Elmslie
George W. Maher
Irving J. Gill
Henry G. Fiddelke
Silsbee was one of the first professors of architecture at Syracuse University, another one of the earliest schools of architecture in the nation.  He was a founding member of the Chicago and Illinois Chapters of the American Institute of Architects.  In 1894, Silsbee was awarded the Peabody Medal by the Franklin Institute for his design for a Moving Sidewalk.  This invention had its debut at the Worlds Columbian Exposition and saw usage in subsequent Worlds Fairs.

Style of architecture
Among his most prominent architectural works is the landmark Syracuse Savings Bank Building (1876).  Built next to the Erie Canal on Clinton Square in Syracuse, it is often referred to as a textbook example of the High Victorian Gothic style.  Silsbee also designed the White Memorial Building (1876), the Amos Block (1878), and the Oakwood Cemetery Chapel (1879–80), all extant in Syracuse. Upland Farm (1892), the lost mansion designed for Frederick R. and Dora Sedgwick Hazard in nearby Solvay, New York, is an example of the fashionable residential work that Silsbee was best known for. Silsbee also designed various dwellings around New York State in Ballston Spa, Albany, and Peekskill (in the latter place for Henry Ward Beecher)

Silsbee designed the lavish interiors of Potter Palmer's "castle" in Chicago.  Several of his residential designs survive in Riverside and Evanston Illinois. His most prominent surviving work in Chicago is the Lincoln Park Conservatory. Considerably smaller in scale but filled with such elegant details as mosaic floors and a graceful oak roof with "hammer-beams trusses and curved brackets" is his Horatio N. May Chapel on the grounds of Rosehill Cemetery. Silsbee designed the movable walkway at the World's Columbian Exposition pier in 1893, and submitted plans to provide this improvement for the Brooklyn Bridge in 1894, although these plans were never executed.

In his 1941 autobiography, Frank Lloyd Wright wrote:

Silsbee practiced architecture until his death in 1913.

Works
Works include:

Gallery

References

Notes

Further reading 
 Syracuse-Onondaga County Planning Agency (1975). Onondaga Landmarks.
 Harley McKee, Patricia Earle, Paul Malo (1964). Architecture Worth Saving in Onondaga County. Syracuse: Syracuse University Press.
 Angela Hess.

External links 

 Joseph Lyman Silsbee at buffalo.edu
 Joseph Lyman Silsbee, Syracuse
 Syracuse Savings Bank photographs
 White Memorial Building photographs
 Amos Block photographs
 Oakwood Memorial Chapel photographs
 Hazard Mansion photographs

1848 births
1913 deaths
Phillips Exeter Academy alumni
Harvard University alumni
MIT School of Architecture and Planning alumni
19th-century American architects
20th-century American architects
Architects from Massachusetts
Architects from Syracuse, New York
Architects from Buffalo, New York
Architects from Chicago
Burials at Oakwood Cemetery (Syracuse, New York)
People from Salem, Massachusetts